Southwood Open Space is a 12.9 hectare Local Nature Reserve (LNR) in Old Malden in the Royal Borough of Kingston upon Thames in London. It is a linear park along the Hogsmill River between the Kingston Bypass opposite Elmbridge Avenue and the junction between the Hogsmill and a footpath to Manor Drive North.

The name Southwood Open Space is only used on the Natural England database of LNRs, and it is more commonly regarded as part of the Hogsmill River Park or Hogsmill Valley, which extends north to Elmbridge Open Space LNR. Hogsmill Valley is designated a Site of Borough Importance for Nature Conservation, Grade 1.
 
The site is mainly grassland, with hedgerows of elm scrub. These were mainly dominated by elm trees until they were destroyed by Dutch Elm Disease.

The London Loop long-distance walk goes through the park.

References

Nature reserves in the Royal Borough of Kingston upon Thames
Local nature reserves in Greater London